Henikstein is an Austrian noble family that descended from a clan of Jewish merchants. One of the most notable members was Adam Adalbert Hönig (1740-1811), who later took the name Edler von Henikstein. There was also Joseph von Henikstein (1768-1838), who was a prominent patron of Austrian arts and was a convert to Catholicism. During the Austro-Prussian war of 1866, his son Alfred Freiherr von Henikstein was a general on the Austrian side and became the Chief of General Staff. 

 Joseph von Henikstein
 Alfred Freiherr von Henikstein (1810, Oberdöbling - 1882, Vienna), son of Joseph

See also 
 Hönig
 Henig
 Honig

References

Germanic-language surnames
Jewish surnames
Austrian noble families
Jewish families
Jews from Galicia (Eastern Europe)
Austrian Jews
Austro-Hungarian Jews
Jewish Austrian history
Yiddish-language surnames